Beloved is the third and final full-length studio album by Australian metalcore band I Killed the Prom Queen. It was released in Australia on 14 February 2014 and in US on 18 February 2014. The album was streamed on Alternative Press's website on 5 February 2014.

This is the first album from the band since its reformation along with three new members, Jamie Hope (vocals), Shane O'Brien (drums) and Benjamin Coyte (bass).

Critical reception

At Alternative Press, Dan Slessor rated the album four stars out of five stars, stating that "the finished product more than justifies the wait." Andrew Kapper of About.com concluded that "Beloved is without doubt a strong comeback for the band, but it does have a couple of weak points in the armor, both of which fall into the same category. The lack of big anthems will probably make the album uneventful for casual fans, while the heavier parts rely on the same format and almost become indistinguishable from one another." However, Rock Sound were very positive about the album, writing that "Beloved is both a reincarnation of old and a lesson in modern metalcore that makes IKTPQ the oldest newcomers to stake their claim for 2014." Kill Your Stereo described the album as "a bold declaration of forward momentum while doing classic I Killed the Prom Queen the way only they know how."

Track listing

Personnel 

I Killed the Prom Queen
 Jamie Hope – vocals
 Jona Weinhofen – guitar, clean vocals
 Kevin Cameron - guitar
 Benjamin Coyte – bass
 Shane O'Brien – drums

Additional personnel
 Bjorn "Speed" Strid – additional production
 Ettore Rigotti – keyboard, programming and orchestral arrangements at The Metal House Studio
 Jona Weinhofen – additional orchestral arrangements on "Kjærlighet", "Melior" and "Brevity"
 Christoffer Franzen of Lights & Motion – additional guitars, keyboard and programming on "Beginning of the End", "Kjærlighet", and "Brevity"
 Randy Slaugh – live string sessions production and engineering
 Ken Dudley at Cottonwood Studios – string sessions mixing
 Sarah Abbott – violin
 Doug Ferry – violin
 Sara Bauman – violin
 Amanda Cox – viola
 Julie Slaugh – viola
 Sydney Howard – viola
 Joseph Woodward – cello
 Isaac Hales – cello
 Jakob Printzlau – album art

References

I Killed the Prom Queen albums
2014 albums